Jeffrey Dunston Zients (born November 12, 1966) is an American business executive and government official, serving as the 31st White House chief of staff in the administration of U.S. President Joe Biden. Earlier in the Biden administration, he served as counselor to the President and White House Coronavirus Response Coordinator from January 2021 to April 2022.

During the presidency of Barack Obama, Zients served as director of the National Economic Council from February 2014 to January 2017, served as acting director of the Office of Management and Budget in 2010 and from 2012 to 2013, and led the emergency effort to fix healthcare.gov after the troubled launch of that critical component of the Affordable Care Act.

Before entering government, Zients was an executive at firms including The Advisory Board Company and CEB. Zients joined the Biden administration after taking leave from his position as chief executive officer of Cranemere, an investment firm. He was a member of Facebook's board of directors from 2018 to 2020.

Early life and education
Zients was born in Washington, D.C., and raised in Kensington, Maryland. His family is Jewish. Zients graduated from the St. Albans School in 1984 and earned a bachelor's degree in political science from Duke University, graduating summa cum laude in 1988.

Early business career
After college, Zients worked in management consulting for Mercer Management Consulting (now Oliver Wyman) and Bain & Company. As a consultant, Zients reportedly enjoyed the “culture, teamwork … and analytical rigor". After management consulting, he was appointed the chief operating officer of DGB Enterprises, a holding company for the Advisory Board Company, Corporate Executive Board, and Atlantic Media Company.

At age 35, Zients was named to Fortune Magazine's "40 under 40", with an estimated wealth of $149 million.

Advisory board and corporate executive board
Zients was the chief operating officer (1996–1998), chief executive officer (1998–2000), and  chairman (2001–2004) of the Advisory Board Company and former chairman (2000–2001) of the Corporate Executive Board. Zients and David G. Bradley took each of the companies public through initial public offerings that made both men multimillionaires.

Portfolio Logic
Zients founded and was the managing partner of Portfolio Logic LLC, an investment firm primarily focused on health care and business services. He was a member of the board of directors of XM Satellite Radio until its 2008 merger, and a board member at Sirius XM Radio until his Senate confirmation. Zients also sat on the boards of Revolution Health Group and Timbuk2 Designs.

Baseball
In 2005, Zients formed a group with Colin Powell and Fred Malek, among others, to compete for the purchase of the Washington Nationals. The group planned for Malek to be the managing partner for the first three years, after which Zients would take over. The group was unsuccessful; the team was purchased by a group led by Ted Lerner.

Obama administration

Office of Management and Budget
In 2009, President Barack Obama appointed Zients to the new position of United States Chief Performance Officer and Deputy Director for Management (DDM) of the Office of Management and Budget. It was Zients's first governmental experience.

According to Obama, his assignment was to help "streamline processes, cut costs, and find best practices throughout" the U.S. government. His nomination was approved by the Senate in June 2009. As DDM, Zients established and chaired the President's Management Council.

Zients was the acting director of OMB from July 2010 to November 2010, and again from January 2012 to April 2013.

Healthcare.gov 
Following the error-plagued launch of healthcare.gov on October 1, 2013, Obama and White House Chief of Staff Denis McDonough asked Zients to take charge of fixing the website. While leading the "tech surge" to do that, Zients also had an ownership position in PSA Healthcare. The position of the White House was that Zients's stake in PSA Healthcare, a pediatric home health business, was not a conflict of interest.

National Economic Council

From 2014 to 2017, Zients was an assistant to the president for economic policy and director of the National Economic Council (NEC). Zients also chaired the President's Management Advisory Board. The Wall Street Journal called Zients "a kind of ambassador to the business community", and lobbying groups such as the Business Roundtable and the U.S. Chamber of Commerce praised Zients as someone who heard them out.

At NEC, Zients worked with the Department of Labor to finalize the fiduciary rule, also known as the conflict of interest rule. It required financial advisers to provide advice in their clients' best interest. The rule was strongly criticized by Wall Street leaders and business groups and was struck down by a federal appeals court in 2018.

In 2015, while NEC director, Zients described the Trans-Pacific Partnership as "a massive tax cut for American businesses".

Return to the private sector

Facebook 
Zients joined Facebook's board of directors in 2018, following the Cambridge Analytica scandal. While on Facebook's board, Zients chaired the Audit and Risk Oversight Committee. According to Facebook, he declined to seek re-election in 2020 "to devote more time to his business and other professional interests". Zients was paid $100,000 in cash and roughly $300,000 in stock in exchange for his work on Facebook's audit committee. As of December 2020, Zients had reportedly sold all of his holdings of Facebook stock.

Cranemere 
Zients was the CEO of the Wall Street investment firm Cranemere, an investment firm owned by Vincent Mai, for which he earned a combined salary and bonus of $1.6 million. , Zients was on leave from his position as chief executive officer of Cranemere.

Biden administration 

In summer 2020, Politico reported that Saguaro Strategies, a media and consulting firm, heavily edited Zients's Wikipedia article as he became more prominent in the Joe Biden 2020 presidential campaign. For example, Zients had advocated the Trans-Pacific Partnership, which faced left-wing opposition, but the edit gave Zients’ argument that it was "the most progressive trade agreement there’s ever been." It eliminated an Obama official's comment that he thought Zients was a Republican.

, Zients was co-chair of the presidential transition of Joe Biden. He was described as "an important power center in the Biden transition team" and noted as a candidate for several positions in the incoming administration. On December 7, 2020, the Biden transition announced Zients's presumptive appointment as coordinator of the COVID-19 response and counselor to the president. The absence of any comprehensive COVID-19 vaccine distribution plan at the time of the handover from the outgoing Trump administration became an urgent priority for Zients after the inauguration on January 20, 2021.

In July 2021, Zients came under criticism for delaying the relaxation of travel restrictions between the US and Europe.

In March 2022, Zients announced he would be leaving the Biden administration in April, to be succeeded as Coronavirus Response Coordinator by Ashish Jha.

On January 22, 2023, it was reported that Zients would replace Ron Klain as the White House Chief of Staff in February. On February 8, 2023, following President Joe Biden's State of the Union Address the previous night, Zients took office to become the 31st White House Chief of Staff.

Notes

References

External links
 
 

1966 births
21st-century American politicians
American chief operating officers
American company founders
American management consultants
American technology chief executives
Bain & Company employees
Biden administration personnel
Businesspeople from Washington, D.C.
Deputy Directors for Management of the Office of Management and Budget
Directors of the Office of Management and Budget
Duke University alumni
Living people
Obama administration cabinet members
Jewish American government officials
People from Kensington, Maryland
St. Albans School (Washington, D.C.) alumni
White House Chiefs of Staff